Sumit (born 20 December 1996) is an Indian field hockey player who plays as a midfielder for the Indian national team.

He was part of the Indian squad that won the 2016 Men's Hockey Junior World Cup. He made his senior team debut at the 2017 Sultan Azlan Shah Cup.

References

External links
Sumit at Hockey India

1996 births
Living people
People from Sonipat
Indian male field hockey players
Field hockey players from Haryana
Male field hockey midfielders
Olympic field hockey players of India
Field hockey players at the 2020 Summer Olympics
Field hockey players at the 2018 Commonwealth Games
2018 Men's Hockey World Cup players
Commonwealth Games competitors for India
Olympic bronze medalists for India
Medalists at the 2020 Summer Olympics
Olympic medalists in field hockey
Recipients of the Arjuna Award